Nichiren Flowers (born August 26, 1983) is a former American football wide receiver in the Arena Football League who played for the Los Angeles Avengers, Chicago Rush, San Jose SaberCats, and Spokane Shock. He played college football for the Nevada Wolf Pack.

References

1983 births
Living people
American football wide receivers
Los Angeles Avengers players
Chicago Rush players
San Jose SaberCats players
Spokane Shock players
Nevada Wolf Pack football players